The News and Press is a local newspaper serving Darlington County, South Carolina. It is currently published in print and online.

History 
The Darlington News was established in 1875 as a weekly, publishing on Thursdays. In 1908 it was consolidated with the Darlington Press, under the new name News and Press.

References

Newspapers published in South Carolina